Crimea: The Last Crusade is a book by Orlando Figes. Figes argued that the Crimean War was the first truly modern war and that the Siege of Sevastopol was a precursor of trench warfare. He also emphasized the religious aspects of the Crimean War and the importance of public opinion. It appeared in the midst of the controversy over Figes's Amazon reviews.

In the United States the book has been published under the title The Crimean War: A History.

Reception

Gary J. Bass of Princeton University praised Figes "painstaking archival work". Angus Macqueen commented in The Guardian that Figes underlines how the Cold War "froze over fundamental fault lines that had opened up in the 19th century". Oliver Bullough in The Independent called the book "lucid, well-written, alive and sensitive". He praised it for its "startling immediacy", for highlighting parallels with contemporary conflicts and for describing the impact of high politics on ordinary people. Nevertheless, he also wrote that the book is not perfect and that the sourcing is problematic.

References

Allen Lane (imprint) books
Books about military history
2010 non-fiction books
Works by Orlando Figes